The Frogmore Plantation Complex, located on Saint Helena Island, in Beaufort County, South Carolina, is significant for several reasons. First, the plantation home, along with its contributing properties (i.e. pump house, barn, windmill/water tower), offers an excellent example of the area's architectural development from 1790 to 1920. Second, the plantation's long association with prominent families contributes to its significance. The plantation was first owned by Lieutenant Governor William Bull, who then willed it to his son in 1750.

After the Civil War, the house was purchased by two northern missionaries — Miss Laura Matilda Towne and Miss Ellen Murray — who founded the historic Penn School, located within the Penn Center. The Frogmore Plantation Complex was listed in the National Historic Register on May 26, 1989.

References

External links

Historic American Buildings Survey in South Carolina
Agricultural buildings and structures on the National Register of Historic Places in South Carolina
Historic districts on the National Register of Historic Places in South Carolina
Houses completed in 1920
Houses in Beaufort County, South Carolina
National Register of Historic Places in Beaufort County, South Carolina
Plantations in South Carolina
Plantation houses in South Carolina